Raven Peninsula is the mostly ice-covered peninsula projecting 5.5 km southeastwards from Nordenskjöld Coast in Graham Land, and 5.2 km wide.  It is bounded by Odrin Bay to the north and Desislava Cove to the southwest, and ends in Cape Worsley to the southeast.  The peninsula was formed as a result of the retreat of Aleksiev Glacier and the glacier featuring Arrol Icefall in the early 21st century.  It is named after the town of Raven in medieval Southwestern Bulgaria.

Location
British mapping in 1978.

Maps
 British Antarctic Territory.  Scale 1:200000 topographic map.  DOS 610 Series, Sheet W 64 60.  Directorate of Overseas Surveys, Tolworth, UK, 1978.
 Antarctic Digital Database (ADD). Scale 1:250000 topographic map of Antarctica. Scientific Committee on Antarctic Research (SCAR). Since 1993, regularly upgraded and updated.

References
 Raven Peninsula. SCAR Composite Antarctic Gazetteer.
 Bulgarian Antarctic Gazetteer. Antarctic Place-names Commission. (details in Bulgarian, basic data in English)

External links
 Raven Peninsula. Copernix satellite image

Headlands of Graham Land
Nordenskjöld Coast
Bulgaria and the Antarctic